Puyi Township is a township under the control of Ning'er Hani and Yi Autonomous County, Yunnan, China. , it has eight villages under its administration:
Puyi Village
Tiantouzhai Village
Manya Village
Pusheng Village
Puzhi Village
Duanjin Village
Gantang Village
Sanqiutian Village

References 

Townships of Pu'er City
Ning'er Hani and Yi Autonomous County